Aleksei Viktorovich Kosolapov (born 17 March 1971) is a Russian-Kazakhstani football coach and a former player. He works as an assistant coach with FC Sakhalinets Moscow.

Honours
 Russian Premier League runner-up: 1995.
 Russian Premier League bronze: 1994, 1998.
 Russian Cup winner: 1996, 1997.
 Russian Cup runner-up: 1998.
 Liga Leumit (top division) runner-up: 1999.
 Kazakhstan Premier League winner: 2007, 2008
 Kazakhstan Premier League runner-up: 2003.
 Kazakhstan Cup winner: 2005, 2008
 Kazakhstan Super Cup winner: 2008
 Top 33 players year-end list: 1993, 1994, 1995, 1997.

International career
Kosolapov made his debut for Russia on 6 October 1993 in a friendly against Saudi Arabia. He played for Russia in two more friendlies in 1994 and several 1998 FIFA World Cup qualifiers in 1997 (but not in the knockout qualification games against Italy). He scored his only international goal against Israel in a qualifier in June 1997.

External links 
  Profile

1971 births
Living people
People from Pushkino
Russian footballers
Association football midfielders
Association football defenders
Russia international footballers
FC Spartak Moscow players
FC Tyumen players
FC Lokomotiv Moscow players
FC Akhmat Grozny players
FC Sokol Saratov players
Sporting de Gijón players
Maccabi Tel Aviv F.C. players
FC Tobol players
FC Zhenis Astana players
FC Aktobe players
Expatriate footballers in Spain
La Liga players
Expatriate footballers in Israel
Expatriate footballers in Kazakhstan
Russian expatriate footballers
Russian expatriate sportspeople in Kazakhstan
Russian Premier League players
Kazakhstan Premier League players
Sportspeople from Moscow Oblast